Jody Porter (born May 25, 1969) is an American musician. He was the lead guitarist of Grammy Award-nominated power pop band Fountains of Wayne. The band released four major label albums, including Welcome Interstate Managers on Virgin Records in 2003, an RIAA-certified Gold LP. The album spawned the hugely popular U.S. Top 40 hit and number 1 music video "Stacy's Mom".

The Belltower

Known for his impressive virtuoso abilities and British guitar pop playing style, Jody first garnered attention fronting and writing the songs for London-based band The Belltower in the early 1990s. Although the band created a buzz for itself overseas, including Melody Maker and NME singles of the week and top chart positions, their major label debut Popdropper sold marginally. The band came back to the US and eventually broke up in 1996.

Fountains of Wayne

Porter was then asked by his friend Adam Schlesinger (who had already been brought into The Belltower briefly) to join his newly formed band Fountains of Wayne before their self-titled Atlantic debut. Porter continued with Fountains of Wayne through their 1999 release, Utopia Parkway. However, after the band was dropped from Atlantic Records in 2001, Fountains of Wayne went on hiatus.  In 2003, the band reformed and entered the studio to do a spate of demos which would eventually become Welcome Interstate Managers on Virgin records. The band received two Grammy nominations in 2004 and released Out of State Plates, a collection of b sides and rarities the following year. They reassembled in 2007 for their next studio album Traffic and Weather which was said to have been recorded largely by Schlesinger and Porter.

The AstroJet

Jody Porter also once fronted the short-lived New York-based alternative band The Astrojet. 
In 2002, The Astrojet recorded a 6 track EP of Porter-penned songs entitled, The Mile Low Club. 
In early 2004, he disbanded the group to reassemble Fountains of Wayne and continue as a solo artist.

Guest appearances

Porter has played on albums with Albert Hammond Jr., Ivy, Jesse Malin, The Monkees, Brookville, David Mead and Juliana Hatfield.

Porter has been credited on albums playing bass, keyboards and drums in addition to vocals and guitar.

Solo

In 2008 Porter finished work on his debut solo album, Close to the Sun.  The 12-song album bridges the gap between the sonic atmospheric stylings of the Belltower and the guitar-driven power pop of Fountains of Wayne; it was coproduced by Michael Tudor and Gordon Raphael (Strokes, Regina Spektor). The album was first released in Japan by FAEC/Rough Trade on July 2, 2008, and was later picked up by Engine Room Recordings and slated for worldwide release on May 11, 2010.

Porter's second solo album, Month of Mondays, was successfully funded via Kickstarter on July 24, 2013.

In 2022, Porter released his third studio album Waterways.

Musical equipment 

Jody has used an arsenal of vintage guitars over the years, most notably a three pick-up Les Paul Custom, several early '60s Fender Jazzmasters, Fender Telecaster various vintage Gretsch models, and more recently a '57 Les Paul Junior that belonged to his father and a new signature guitar. His signature guitar is a SchoolHoused BeachBlaster which consists of a surf green finish and 3-Seymour Duncan Whole Lotta humbuckers. He has generally favored Vox amps.

References

External links 
Jody Porter's Homepage

American rock guitarists
American male guitarists
Living people
Fountains of Wayne members
1969 births